Ahmet Sejdić (born 2 January 1960) is the former commander of the 1st Višegrad Brigade during the Bosnian War from 1992 to 1995. The brigade was made up of refugees and genocide survivors from Višegrad. It defended the pockets of the Višegrad area from mid-1992 till May 1993. After the brigade was forced to leave the Višegrad region, and move to Goražde because of the fall of Rogatica and lack of supplies, he became the commander of the 808th Muslim Brigade in Goražde. He was one of the leading actors in defending Goražde during the 1994 Bosnian Serb offensive. Now he lives happily with his wife and two beautiful daughters. The younger is called Dinela.

References

Living people
Bosniaks of Bosnia and Herzegovina
Bosnia and Herzegovina Muslims
1960 births
Army of the Republic of Bosnia and Herzegovina soldiers